Schillingstraße is a Berlin U-Bahn station located on the .

History
It was built in 1930 by A. Grenander. There was a total damage on 7 May 1944, and it was repaired by 1946. The western entrance was closed in 1959, and only eastern entrance exists. In 2003 the station was renovated again and orange/red panels were attached on the walls.

References

U5 (Berlin U-Bahn) stations
Buildings and structures in Mitte
Railway stations in Germany opened in 1930